Eupatagidae is a family of echinoderms belonging to the order Spatangoida.

Genera:
 Brissoides Schinz, 1825
 Eupatagus Agassiz, 1847
 Euspatangus Cotteau, 1869
 Herreraster
 Heterospatangus
 Megapatagus
 Zanolettiaster

References

Spatangoida
Echinoderm families